The American Association for Cancer Research gives several annual awards for significant contributions to the field of cancer research.

AACR Award for Lifetime Achievement in Cancer Research 
This award recognizes prodigious scientists that have made profound contributions to the field of cancer research.
 2018: Joseph R. Bertino
 2017: Mina Bissell
 2016: Robert A. Weinberg
 2015: Mario R. Capecchi
 2014: Douglas Hanahan
 2013: Harold L. Moses
 2012: Beatrice Mintz
 2011: Susan Band Horwitz
 2010: Janet D. Rowley
 2009: Joseph F. Fraumeni, Jr.
 2008: Harald zur Hausen
 2007: Donald Metcalf
 2006: Bernard Fisher
 2005: Alfred G. Knudson, Jr.
 2004: Emil Frei III

AACR Award for Outstanding Achievement in Cancer Research 
This award recognizes the outstanding research of investigators under the age of 40.
 This award has not been given since 2016.
 2016: Franziska Michor
 2015: Christopher R. Vakoc
 2014: Nima Sharifi
 2013: Roger S. Lo
 2012: Yibin Kang
 2011: Nathanael S. Gray
 2010: Joshua T. Mendell
 2009: Victor Velculescu
 2008: Arul Chinnaiyan
 2007: Kornelia Polyak
 2006: Ivan Dikic
 2005: Gregory J. Hannon
 2004: Xiaodong Wang
 2003: none
 2002: Todd R. Golub
 2001: Scott W. Lowe
 2000: Nikola P. Pavletich
 1999: John Kuriyan
 1998: Michael C. Dean
 1997: Tyler Jacks
 1996: Carol W. Greider
 1995: Eric S. Lander
 1994: Igor B. Roninson
 1993: Tom Curran
 1992: Elizabeth Robertson
 1991: Richard C. Mulligan
 1990: Ronald M. Evans
 1989: Bert Vogelstein
 1988: Webster K. Cavenee
 1987: Peter M. Blumberg
 1986: Mariano Barbacid
 1985: Lance A. Liotta
 1984: Charles D. Stiles
 1983: Susan Astrin
 1982: Stuart A. Aaronson
 1981: Yung-Chi Cheng
 1980: Malcolm A. S. Moore

AACR Joseph H. Burchenal Memorial Award for Outstanding Achievement in Clinical Cancer Research 
This award is given for achievements in clinical research.
 2019: Susan L. Cohn
 2018: Johann S. de Bono
 2017: Judy E. Garber
 2016: John C. Byrd
 2015: Elizabeth M. Jaffee
 2014: John F. DiPersio
 2013: Hagop M. Kantarjian
 2012: Lawrence H. Einhorn
 2011: Ching-Hon Pui
 2010: Henry T. Lynch
 2009: W. Marston Linehan
 2008: Joseph R. Bertino
 2007: Kenneth C. Anderson
 2006: Merrill J. Egorin
 2005: Jimmie C. Holland
 2004: Clara D. Bloomfield
 2003: David S. Alberts
 2002: Lee M. Nadler
 2001: Rainer F. Storb
 2000: Waun Ki Hong
 1999: John Mendelsohn
 1998: Bernard Fisher
 1997: Ronald Levy
 1996: Samuel A. Wells Jr.

AACR-CRI Lloyd J. Old Award in Cancer Immunology 
This award is given for major contributions to the field of cancer immunology.
 2018: Antoni Ribas
 2017: Olivera Finn
 2016: Ronald Levy
 2015: Carl H. June
 2014: Robert D. Schreiber
 2013: James P. Allison

AACR-Prevent Cancer Foundation Award for Excellence in Cancer Prevention Research 
This award is given to scientists for have made significant discoveries in cancer prevention.
 2014: Graham A. Colditz
 2013: John P. Pierce
 2012: Jack Cuzick
 2011: Andrew J. Dannenberg
 2010: John D. Groopman
 2009: Mark W. Schiffman
 2008: Frank L. Meyskens, Jr.
 2007: Leslie Bernstein
 2006: Stephen S. Hecht
 2005: Scott M. Lippman
 2004: David S. Alberts
 2003: Waun Ki Hong

AACR Princess Takamatsu Memorial Lectureship 
This award recognizes successful scientists dedicated to international collaborations.
 2018: Lisa M. Coussens
 2017: Louis M. Staudt
 2016: William G. Kaelin Jr.
 2015: Lewis C. Cantley
 2014: Rakesh K. Jain
 2013: Carlo M. Croce
 2012: Mary J.C. Hendrix
 2011: Philip Hanawalt
 2010: Mary-Claire King
 2009: Curtis C. Harris
 2008: Lawrence A. Loeb
 2007: Webster K. Cavenee
 2002: Michael B. Sporn

AACR Team Science Award 
This award is given to promote collaboration to further breakthroughs in cancer research.

 2018: Genomic Approaches to Preventing and Treating Asian-Prevalent Cancers Team"
 Patrick Tan, Steven G. Rozen, Sen-Yung Hsieh, Chiea Chuen Khor, Narong Khuntikeo, Soon Thye Lim, Choon Kiat Ong, Chawalit Pairojkul, See-Tong Pang, Tatsuhiro Shibata, Bin Tean Teh
 2017: International Liquid Biopsy Initiative Team"
Luis A. Diaz, Nishant Agrawal, Chetan Bettegowda, Frank Diehl, Peter Gibbs, Stanley R. Hamilton, Ralph H. Hruban, Hartmut Juhl, Isaac Kinde, Kenneth Kinzler, Martin Nowak, Nickolas Papadopoulos, David Sidransky, Jeanne Tie, Victor E. Velculescu, Bert Vogelstein
 2016: Women's Health Initiative Team:
Ross L. Prentice, Garnet L. Anderson, Bette Caan, Rowan T. Chlebowski, Rebecca D. Jackson, Charles Kooperberg, JoAnn E. Manson, Electra D. Paskett, Jacques E. Rossouw, Sally A. Shumaker, Marcia L. Stefanick, Cynthia Ann Thomson, Jean Wactawski-Wende
 2015: Designing AR Inhibitors Team:
Charles L. Sawyers, Michael E. Jung, Howard Scher
 2014: Duke University/Johns Hopkins, and NCI Malignant Brain Tumor Team:
Darell D. Bigner, Bert Vogelstein, Ira Pastan, Daniel Barboriak, Oren J. Becher, Thomas J. Cummings, Annick Desjardins, Luis A. Diaz, Allan Friedman, Henry S. Friedman, Matthias Gromeier, Sridharan Gururangan, Yiping He, Kenneth W. Kinzler, Chien-Tsun Kuan, Roger E. McLendon, Nickolas Papadopoulos, Katherine B. Peters, Tulika Ranjan, B. K. Ahmed Rasheed, John H. Sampson, Victor E. Velculescu, Gordana Vlahovic, Jason A. Watts, Hai Yan, Michael R. Zalutsky
 2013: Johns Hopkins Pancreatic Cancer Sequencing Team in the Sol Goldman Pancreatic Cancer Research Center at Johns Hopkins University:
Ralph H. Hruban, N. Volkan Adsay, Peter J. Allen, Michael A. Choti, Luis A. Diaz, James R. Eshleman, Michael G. Goggins, Joseph M. Herman, Christine A. Iacobuzio-Donahue, Scott E. Kern, Kenneth W. Kinzler, Alison P. Klein, David S. Klimstra, Anirban Maitra, Alan K. Meeker, Nickolas Papadopoulos, Victor E. Velculescu, Bert Vogelstein, Christopher L. Wolfgang, Laura DeLong Wood
 2012: The Institute of Cancer Research (ICR) and Royal Marsden Hospital: Cancer Research UK Cancer Therapeutics Unit and Drug Development Units:
Bissan Al-Lazikani, Udai Banerji, Julian Blagg, Ian Collins, Johann De Bono, Sue Eccles, Michelle Garrett, Swen Hoelder, Keith Jones, Stan Kaye, Spiros Linardopoulos, Richard Marais, Flo Raynaud, Caroline Springer, Rob van Montfort, Paul Workman
 2011: Seattle HPV Research Team:
Janet R. Daling, Denise A. Galloway, James Hughes, Nancy B. Kiviat, Laura Koutsky, Margaret M. Madeleine, Constance Mao, Barbara McKnight, Peggy L. Porter, Stephen M. Schwartz, Hisham K. Tamimi, Long-fu Xi
 2010: Dana-Farber/Harvard Cancer Center Thoracic Oncology Research Team:
Michael J. Eck, Jeffery Engelman, Nathanael Gray, Daniel Haber, Pasi A. Janne, Bruce E. Johnson, Susumu Kobayashi, Eunice Kwak, Neal Lindeman, Thomas J. Lynch, Shyamala Maheswaran, Matthew L. Meyerson, Lecia V. Sequist, Jeffery Settleman, Daniel G. Tenen, Mehmet Toner, Kwok-Kin Wong
 2009: St. Jude Children's Research Hospital Acute Lymphoblastic Leukemia Team:
Dario Campana, Cheng Cheng, James R. Downing, William E. Evans, Melissa M. Hudson, Sima Jeha, Charles Mullighan, Ching-Hon Pui, Susana C. Raimondi, Mary V. Relling, Raul C. Ribeiro
 2008: University of California San Francisco, the Lawrence Berkeley National Laboratory and Roswell Park Comprehensive Cancer Center:
Donna G. Albertson, Jane Fridyland, Joe W. Gray, Ajay Jain, Anne H. Kallioniemi, Olli-Pekka Kallioniemi, Robert Nordmeyer, Norma J. Nowak, Daniel Pinkel, Antoine Sniders, Damir Sudar, Frederick M. Waldmann
 2007: University of Michigan-Brigham and Women's Hospital Team:
Xuhong Cao, Arul Chinnaiyan, Saravana Dhanasekaran, Rohit Mehra, James Montie, Kenneth Pienta, Robin Rasor, Daniel Rhodes, Rajal Shah, Scott A. Tomlins, Sooryanarayana Varambally, John Wei, Francesca Demichelis, Charles Lee, Sven Perner, Mark A. Rubin

References

American Association for Cancer Research
Cancer research awards